The Institute for Social Inventions was a think tank set up in 1985 to publicise and launch good ideas for improving the quality of life. Its founder Nicholas Albery (1948–2001) sought to promote non-technological innovations.

History

The Institute emerged from the informal network of Social centers and Info-services which spread around in London throughout the 1970s. One of the earliests of these centers was BIT Information Service, founded in 1968 by John "Hoppy" Hopkins.

Inception

It was during his years as coordinator of BIT that Nicholas Albery came out with the idea of an Institute who would promote all kinds of ideas and experimentations, developed mainly inside what has been called the "Alternative Society".

Main idea

The institute has been known by different names, such as "Institute for Social Innovations", or "Institute for Social Change". All these denominations revolved around the concept of new improvements to be made within the situation of the mainstream society, as it goes at any time to be considered.

Aftermath

It merged with the Global Ideas Bank, formed in 1995.

See also
 Ideas bank
 List of UK think tanks

References
 Social innovations edited by Albery, Mezey and Radcliffe ISI 0948826 30 4

Ideas banks
Public policy think tanks based in the United Kingdom
Counterculture